The AVN Award for Male Performer of the Year is an award that has been given annually by sex industry company AVN since the award's inception in 1993.

First recipient of the award was Rocco Siffredi, who was awarded at 10th AVN Awards in 1993. As of 2023, Manuel Ferrara is the most honored pornographic actor with six awards followed by Lexington Steele, Mick Blue and Evan Stone with three awards, while four pornographic actorsRocco Siffredi, James Deen, Small Hands and Tom Byronhave won the award two times. Tommy Pistol is the oldest recipient of the award at the age of 45 in 2022 and James Deen is the youngest recipient of the award at the age of 22 in 2009. The most recent recipient is Seth Gamble, who was honoured at the 40th AVN Awards in 2023.

Winners and nominees

1990s

2000s

2010s

2020s

Superlatives

Multiple winners and nominees

Multiple winners

Multiple nominees

See also
 AVN Award for Male Foreign Performer of the Year
 AVN Award for Best Actor
 AVN Award for Best Supporting Actor
 AVN Award for Female Performer of the Year
 AVN Award for Female Foreign Performer of the Year
 AVN Award for Transsexual Performer of the Year

References

External links
 

Awards established in 1993
Male Performer of the Year
Awards for male actors